Assab International Airport  is an international airport in Assab, the capital of the Southern Red Sea region of Eritrea.

Characteristics

It serves as a dual public and military facility. The airport has an 11,531 ft (3,515 m) asphalt runway. It currently receives no regular scheduled airline flights.

History

The airport was created during the colonial era of Italian Eritrea in the late 1930s, as a secondary airport of military support in the region.

Damaged during WW2, for years it has been used only for private and military flights.
In 2017 there it is a civilian weekly flight between Assab and Massawa international Airport. As of November 2018 Eritrean Airlines is planning to start routes to Asmara, and Addis Ababa.

Starting in September 2015, United Arab Emirates armed forces upgraded the airbase to host its military forces to support its intervention in Yemen, with a partial withdraw starting in 2021.

Airlines and destinations

Notes

External links

Assab
Airports in Eritrea